Abyssocottus korotneffi is a species of ray-finned fish belonging to the family Cottidae, the typical sculpins. These sculpins are endemic to Lake Baikal in Russia. Maximum age is 12 years. Females harbour about 20 eggs in each ovary.

A. korotneffi feeds predominantly on debris and amphipod crustaceans.

References

korotneffi
Fish described in 1906
Taxa named by Lev Berg
Fish of Lake Baikal